R40, R-40, or similar, may refer to:

Roads 
 R40 road (Belgium)
 R40 road (Ghana)
 R40 (South Africa)

Other uses 
 R-40 (missile), a Soviet air-to-air missile
 R40 (New York City Subway car)
 Chloromethane, a refrigerant
 R40: Limited evidence of a carcinogenic effect, a risk phrase
 R40 Live Tour, a 2015 tour by Canadian rock Rush
 R40 series of preferred numbers
 Renault R40, a French tank
 Rover 75, an executive car
 Samsung Sens R40, a laptop
 Toyota TownAce (R40), a Japanese van
 R40, a Ferris wheel designed by Ronald Bussink